The 2010–11 East Tennessee State Buccaneers men's basketball team represented East Tennessee State University in the 2010–11 NCAA Division I men's basketball season. The Buccaneers, led by head coach Murry Bartow, played their home games at ETSU/Mountain States Health Alliance Athletic Center in Johnson City, Tennessee, as members of the Atlantic Sun Conference. The Buccaneers finished 2nd in the Atlantic Sun during the regular season, but lost in the second round of the Atlantic Sun tournament after being upset by sixth-seeded .

East Tennessee State failed to qualify for the NCAA tournament, but were invited to the 2011 CIT. The Buccaneers advanced to the semifinals of the CIT, where they were eliminated by Iona, 85–74.

Roster 

Source

Schedule and results

|-
!colspan=9 style=|Exhibition

|-
!colspan=9 style=|Regular season

|-
!colspan=9 style=| Atlantic Sun tournament

|-
!colspan=9 style=| CollegeInsider.com tournament

Source

References

East Tennessee State Buccaneers men's basketball seasons
East Tennessee State
East Tennessee State
East Tennessee State men's basketball
East Tennessee State men's basketball